The 2022 National Football League is the 46th season of the National Football League, after a 3-year absence. The league will feature promotion and relegation between football clubs in  League 1, 2 and the Island Wide League.

League 1

League 2

References

Football in Singapore